Adolan may refer to:

Tramadol, sold under the trade name Adolan
Methadone, also sold under the trade name Adolan